In the 2012–13 season, Partizani Tirana competed in the Kategoria e Parë after promotion from the Kategoria e Dytë.

Competitions

Kategoria e Parë

League table

Results summary

Results by round

Matches

Albanian Cup

First round

Notes

References

External links
Official website 

Partizani
FK Partizani Tirana seasons